Mark van de Wiel (born 1958, Northampton) is an English clarinettist, principal clarinettist of the Philharmonia Orchestra and the London Sinfonietta, and a teacher at the Royal Academy of Music.

References

1958 births
Living people
Academics of the Royal Academy of Music
Classical clarinetists
English clarinetists
People from Northampton
21st-century clarinetists